An San (Hangul: 안산; Hanja: 安山, born 27 February 2001) is a South Korean archer competing in women's recurve events. She won three gold medals at the 2020 Summer Olympics, in the women's team, mixed team and Individual events, becoming the first archer in Olympic history to do so at a single Games. An also set a new Olympic Record scoring 680 points at the Women's Individual Archery's Ranking Round. The previous record of 673 points was set by Ukrainian Lina Herasymenko at the 1996 Summer Olympics.

Career

2017–2019: Early career
She competed at the 2017 World Archery Youth Championships where she won her first medal in mixed team event.

2019–2020: International debut
She made her international debut at the 2019 Archery World Cup stage 4 in Berlin, winning gold in the women's individual, gold in the mixed team, and bronze in women's team event.

In 2020, she shot 1400, in the WA 1440 Round.

2021–present: Olympic triple gold medalist
At 2020 Summer Olympics, she took three gold medals, one from the women's team event, which she won alongside Jang Min-hee and Kang Chae-young, another medal from the mixed team event with Kim Je-deok. Meanwhile, in the semifinals of the mixed team event, the so-called 'Robin Hood arrow', in which an arrow from An penetrates the arrow fired by Kim Je-deok, drew attention. The arrows were donated by the International Olympic Committee along with the uniforms of the two athletes and displayed at the IOC Olympic Museum in Lausanne, Switzerland. After winning in women's individual competition, beating Elena Osipova of Russia, she became triple gold medalist.

An has been subject to online harassment from Korean anti-feminists who criticize her short haircut and her enrollment at Gwangju Women's University. Some women have adopted the hair style in solidarity.

After Tokyo Olympics, she participated in 2021 World Archery Championships in Yankton. She teamed up with Kang Chae Young and Jang Min Hee, winning gold medal in women's team event. This is the 14th time South Korea women's team has won the world title. Later, she paired with Kim Woo-jin. The duo dispatched Russia in straight sets winning gold medal in mixed team event. She also won the bronze medal in the women's individual event, after losing in her semi-final to Casey Kaufhold of the United States.

Filmography

Television shows

Listicles

References

External links 
 

2001 births
Living people
Sportspeople from Gwangju
South Korean female archers
Olympic archers of South Korea
Archers at the 2020 Summer Olympics
Olympic medalists in archery
Olympic gold medalists for South Korea
Medalists at the 2020 Summer Olympics
World Archery Championships medalists
21st-century South Korean women